The kontos was the Greek name for a type of long wooden cavalry lance used by the Iranians, especially Achaemenid successors' cavalry, most notably cataphracts (Grivpanvar).  It was also used by the Germanic warriors of the south as a pike. A shift in the terminology used to describe Sarmatian weapons indicates the kontos was developed in the early to mid 1st century AD from shorter spear-type weapons (which were described using the generic terms for "spear"—longhe or hasta—by Greek and Roman sources, respectively), though such a description may have existed before the Battle of Carrhae, in which Parthian cataphracts, in conjunction with light horse archers, annihilated a Roman army of over three times their numbers.

It was reputedly a weapon of great power compared to other cavalry weapon of its time, described by Plutarch as being "heavy with steel" and capable of impaling two men at once. Its length was probably the origin of its name, as the word kontos could also mean "oar" or "barge-pole" in Greek. Thus, it had to be wielded with two hands while directing the horse using the knees; this made it a specialist weapon that required a lot of training and good horsemanship to use. In addition, most Parthian cavalry (even possibly including cataphracts) carried bows, so this meant daily practice with the weapons.

The Romans adopted a variation of the kontos transliterated as contus. The Roman contus was also wielded two-handed. The later Byzantine kontarion was used by Byzantine cataphracts, from c. 1100 it was used single-handed couched under the armpit, as was the contemporary knightly lance.

The Sasanian lance, known as nēzak (Middle Persian), used by the aswaran cavalry, was derived from the Parthian kontos. The Parthian version was a  lance featuring a sword-like iron-made blade  in length socketed onto the shaft.

The name is the stem of many words for cavalry lances in languages of the region, like gönder (Hungarian, meaning "Roman lance"), and quntariya.

See also
 Sarissa
 Xyston

References

Polearms
Sarmatians
Iranian warfare
Indo-European warfare
Military history of the Sasanian Empire
Military history of the Parthian Empire
Greek words and phrases